The electoral district of St Albans is an electoral district of the Victorian Legislative Assembly. It has existed in 2 incarnations, first from 1985 to 1992, and was created again in the 2013 redistribution and came into effect at the 2014 state election.

It largely covers the area of the abolished seat of Derrimut, including the Melbourne outer western suburbs of St Albans, Sunshine, Keilor Downs, Kealba, Albion and Ardeer.

St Albans was retained at the 2014 election by Labor candidate Natalie Suleyman.

Members for St Albans

Election results

References

External links
 District profile from the Victorian Electoral Commission

Electoral districts of Victoria (Australia)
1985 establishments in Australia
1992 disestablishments in Australia
2014 establishments in Australia
Constituencies established in 1985
Constituencies established in 2004
Constituencies disestablished in 1992
City of Brimbank
Sunshine, Victoria
Electoral districts and divisions of Greater Melbourne